Svitlana Serhiivna Stetsiuk (born 19 August 1974) is a Ukrainian athlete. Master of Sports of Ukraine of international class. She participated at the 2016 Summer Paralympic Games in the shot put where she finished in sixth position.

Stetsiuk is engaged in athletics at the Dnipropetrovsk Regional Center for Physical Culture and Sports for the Disabled "Invasport". Stetsiuk's coaches are Olga Shostak and Victor Lys.

Achievements 

 Silver medalist of the 2013 IPC Athletics World Championships.
 Double silver medalist of the 2014 IPC Athletics European Championships.
 Debutante of the 2016 Summer Paralympics.
 Participant of 2018 World Para Athletics European Championships.

References 

1974 births
Living people
Paralympic athletes of Ukraine
Ukrainian female discus throwers
Ukrainian female javelin throwers
Ukrainian female shot putters
Athletes (track and field) at the 2016 Summer Paralympics
Medalists at the World Para Athletics Championships
Medalists at the World Para Athletics European Championships
Wheelchair shot putters
Wheelchair javelin throwers
Wheelchair discus throwers
Paralympic shot putters